{{Infobox military conflict
| conflict          = Battle of Nancy
| partof            = the Burgundian Wars
| image             = RenéDeux.jpg
| image_size        = 300
| caption           = "Rene takes the town of Nancy", by Pierre Jacobi (1519)
| date              = 5 January 1477
| place             = Outside the walls of Nancy, France
| result            = Lorraine victory, death of Charles the Bold, end of the Burgundian Wars and dissolution of the Burgundian State
| combatant1        = 
| combatant2        = 
| commander1        =  Charles the Bold
| commander2        =  René II, Duke of Lorraine
| strength1         = 2,000–8,000 men
| strength2         = Lorraine: 10,000–12,000 men Swiss: 8,000–10,000 men
| casualties1       = Unknown, presumably near total
| casualties2       = Unknown
}}

The Battle of Nancy was the final and decisive battle of the Burgundian Wars, fought outside the walls of Nancy on 5 January 1477 by Charles the Bold, Duke of Burgundy, against René II, Duke of Lorraine, and the Swiss Confederacy.

René's forces won the battle, and Charles' mutilated body was found three days later.

Background
Charles was besieging the city of Nancy, capital of Lorraine, since 22 October 1476 following its recapture by the forces of René II earlier in the year. Despite the harsh winter conditions, Charles was determined to bring the siege to an end at all costs as he was well aware that sooner or later René would arrive with a relieving army when the weather improved.

By late December René had gathered some 10,000–12,000 men from Lorraine and the Lower Union (of the Rhine); a Swiss army of 8,000–10,000 men also arrived to help out. René began his advance on Nancy early in January 1477, moving cautiously through the snow-covered landscape until they reached Nancy early on the morning of 5 January. Charles finally learned that René's army was indeed close by and drew up the bulk of his army in a strong defensive position south of Nancy on a heavily wooded slope behind a stream at the narrowest part of the valley down which he knew the Swiss would have to advance. The exact numbers available to Charles are hard to judge, but contemporary observers put the numbers between 2,000 and 8,000, for even his household troops were by this stage well below strength, while most of the Ordonnance companies were at best only 50% of their theoretical strength.

Charles, as usual, deployed his troops to a precise battle plan despite the short notice he received of the approach of René's forces. The infantry companies and dismounted gendarme formed up in a large square formation with some 30 field guns in front at the top of the slope, while on either flank were mounted knights and coutilliers.

If Charles suffered from a lack of scouting, which had cost him so dearly at Morat (Murten) six months earlier, the same could not be said for the Allied army. Despite the driving snow cutting visibility to a few yards, the Allied scouts soon recognized that a frontal assault on the Burgundian position would be disastrous. The largely Swiss vanguard of 7,000 infantry and 2,000 cavalry were instructed to attack from the right, while the principal thrust would come from the 8,000 infantry and 1,300 cavalry of the center, which was dispatched on a difficult circuitous march round the left flank, over thickly wooded snow-covered slopes out of view of the waiting Burgundians. The small rearguard of 800 handgunners acted as reserve.

The battle

After a march lasting some two hours, the center force emerged from the wooded slopes slightly to the rear of the Burgundian position and formed up in a wedge formation. The early notes of the Swiss horns sounded thrice, and the Swiss charged downhill into the Burgundian positions. The artillery attempted to retrain on the center force but could not elevate enough to be effective; the single volley discharged killed but two men. Although the right wing Burgundian cavalry held off the Swiss rivals, most of the Swiss infantry pushed on to engage the outnumbered Burgundian infantry square in a one-sided fight. The vanguard threw back the Burgundian left wing and put the artillery to flight. As Charles attempted vainly to stem the center force's advance by transferring troops from his left flank, the weight of numbers arrayed against him became overwhelming, and the once proud army of Burgundy started to melt away in flight.

It is thought that during the fight Charles said: "I struggle against a spider who is everywhere at once," signifying the large amount of Swiss infantry.
 
Determined to the last, Charles and his staff tried in vain to rally the broken army, but without success. His small band was carried with the flight until eventually surrounded by a party of Swiss. A halberdier quickly swung at the Duke's head and landed a deadly blow directly on his helmet. He was seen to fall but the battle flowed on around him. It was three days until the Duke's disfigured body was finally found and positively identified amongst the detritus of the slaughter.

Most of Charles' army was killed during the battle and their retreat. Contemporary chronicles record that the killing of retreating soldiers continued for three days after the battle and that for 5–6 leagues the road was covered with the dead. Some of the soldiers who reached Metz were still so afraid of the pursuing army that they threw themselves into the icy moat in the hope that they could swim to the city.

Commemoration
René II built the church of Notre-Dame-de-Bonsecours on the site of the battle, and the church of St-François-des-Cordeliers in Nancy itself. He furthermore built the basilica of Saint-Nicolas-de-Port to recognize the help of St. Nicholas in the battle. The city adopted the motto of non inultus premor ("I cannot be touched with impunity") and the heraldic device of a thistle as its coat of arms to commemorate the defeat of Charles the Bold.

René II also erected a cross to mark the spot where the body of Charles was found. The nearby étang Saint-Jean was drained in the 19th century, freeing the area of what is now Place de la Croix-de-Bourgogne in Nancy. The original cross was moved to the Lorraine museum. The current monument is a design by Victor Prouvé (1928).

Pierre de Blarru, canon of Saint-Dié, composed a vast poem called la Nancéide, in 5,044 Latin verses, on the war between Burgundy and Lorraine, culminating in the battle of Nancy (first printed in 1518).

Sir Walter Scott wrote a novel, Anne of Geierstein, which reaches its climax in the battle of Nancy (published in 1829).

Eugène Delacroix painted The Battle of Nancy'' in 1831.

In La Malgrange (Jarville), a tower was erected in 1877 to commemorate the attack of René II.

See also
 Battle of Grandson
 Battle of Morat
 Burgundian State
 Old Swiss Confederacy
 Battles of the Old Swiss Confederacy

References

1477 in Europe
Nancy 1477
Nancy, France
Nancy
1470s in France
Nancy